In music, the third factor of a chord is the note or pitch two scale degrees above the root or tonal center. When the third is the bass note, or lowest note, of the expressed triad, the chord is in first inversion.

Use

Conventionally, the third is third in importance to the root and fifth, with the third in all primary triads (I, IV, V and i, iv, v) being either major or minor. In jazz chords and theory, the third is required due to it determining chord quality.

The third in both major and augmented chords is major (E in C) and the third in both minor and diminished chords is minor (E in C).

Tenth

In music and music theory, a tenth is the note ten scale degrees from the root of a chord and also the interval between the root and the tenth.

Since there are only seven degrees in a diatonic scale the tenth degree is the same as the mediant and the interval of a tenth is a compound third.

See also
 List of third intervals

Notes

Further reading

 

Chord factors
3 (number)